Balsai is a Hungarian surname. Notable people with the surname include:

István Balsai (born 1947), Hungarian politician and jurist
Mónika Balsai (born 1977), Hungarian actress

Hungarian-language surnames